The  was the regular edition of the annual Japanese national cup tournament, which was held from 29 August 2015 to its final on 1 January 2016.

The winners, Gamba Osaka, qualified to the group stage of the 2016 AFC Champions League.

Calendar

Participating clubs
88 clubs competed in the tournament. The 18 clubs from 2015 J1 League and 22 clubs from 2015 J2 League received a bye to the second round of the tournament. The other 47 teams earned berths by winning their respective prefectural cup tournaments, and entered from the first round along with the JFL seeded team, the Apertura Champion.

Results

First round

Second round

Third round

Fourth round

Quarter-finals

Semi-finals

Final

References

External links
 Japan Football Association page on the Emperor's Cup (Japanese)

Emperor's Cup
Emperor's Cup
Cup
Cup